The onset of the 20th Century saw England as the world's foremost naval and colonial power, supported by a 100,000-man firefighting army designed to fight small wars in its outlying colonies.  Since the Napoleonic Wars nearly a century earlier, Britain and Europe enjoyed relative peace and tranquility. The onset of World War I caught the British Empire by surprise.  As it increased the size of its army through conscription, one of its first tasks was to impose a complete naval blockade against Germany.  It was not popular in the United States. However, it was very important to England.

The position of Minister of Blockade grew from the merger of Britain's Eastern and Western Departments of the Foreign Office in August 1914 to form a new War Department.  The War Department's mission was to prepare England for a continental war.  One of its earliest creations was the Contraband Department, which in February 1916 was upgraded (transferred from the military to the government) and renamed the Ministry of Blockade.  The Ministry of Blockade was responsible for maintaining both a land and sea blockade against Germany.

Lord Robert Cecil 
The Minister of Blockade was a position headed by Lord Robert Cecil from 1916 to 1918 to enforce the economic blockade against Germany. Cecil, undersecretary at the Foreign Office, assumed responsibility for the Ministry of Blockade, and was its sole leader during its two years of existence.  The trade embargo is estimated to have cost Germany 500,000 civilian lives, and it was one of the reasons why Germany sued for peace in 1918.  In a war that took terrible battlefield casualties on the Western Front, the Blockade was one of the few bright spots England could point to before 1918.

Prior to The Great War, the British had occasional discussions about a blockade against Germany in the event of conflict.  However, it wasn't until 23 February 1916, 18 months after World War I started, that Prime Minister H. H. Asquith created a Ministry of Blockade to unite all of England's embargo efforts against Germany.  The Blockade was greatly helped by Room 40 and the capture of German code books in 1914.  To enforce the blockade, the shipping companies of neutral countries were pressured into declaring their goods, and ships with cargo bound for Germany were seized.  Germany, which provided most of her raw materials internally, but imported much of her food, was forced to implement a food rationing program, but the problem grew progressively worse.  

It was Cecil's idea for the Allies to acquire seized Dutch shipping to boost the transport of American reinforcements to France during the critical months of 1918, when the war could have gone either way, which helped aid in the capitulation of Germany.

Greece 
In June 1916, the British orchestrated a pacific blockade against Greece, due to that country's pro-German leanings.  It was rescinded a year later with the replacement of King Constantine by his son, Alexander.

Versailles
The issue of a Blockade, Freedom of the Seas, and Belligerent Rights became important after President Wilson announced his 14 Points on January 8, 1918.  The announcement was made unilaterally, without informing the allies, and Prime Minister Lloyd George could not agree to Point number two, "Absolute Freedom of Navigation" of the seas for all countries, as the blockade of Germany violated this Point.  Following the allied victory over Germany, the 14 Points became less relevant, being substituted by The Treaty of Versailles in June 1919.

Present day 
Although the United States enforced a temporary blockade against Cuba in 1962, and continues to enforce a solitary economic blockade, today the naval blockade of a country is outlawed by the Geneva Convention.

Footnotes

References 
 Roskill, Stephen, Hankey, Man of Secrets, Volume I, London: Collins, 1970
 Milner, Viscount, Cotton Contraband, London: Darling, 1915
 Black List and Blockade, interview with the Rt. Hon. Lord Robert Cecil, M.P., Eyre and Spottiswoode, 1916 
 
 The War Cabinet, Report for the Year 1917, London: His Majesty's Stationery Office, 1918
 UK National Archives, online Link
 Neillands, Robin, The Great War Generals on the Western Front, 1914-1918, London: Magpie, 1999
 Callwell, MG C.E., Field Marshal Sir Henry Wilson, His Life and Diaries, Vol. II, London: Cassell, 1927

Other Reading 
 Internet Archive (please sign up to view links to footnotes and references): Link
 Encyclopedia Britannica: "Blockade" on-line citation
 International Encyclopedia of the First World War: "Freedom of the Seas" on-line citation
 UK National Archives, CAB 24-46 (pgs. 6-10 of 343)
 The British Blockade During World War I: The Weapon of Deprivation: Link
 A list of historical blockades

Germany
Military history of the United Kingdom during World War I